Rajhrad is a town in Brno-Country District in the South Moravian Region of the Czech Republic. It has about 4,000 inhabitants.

Geography
It lies in the Dyje–Svratka Valley. It is situated on the right bank of the Svratka River.

History
The first written mention of Rajhrad is from 1169. It was probably founded at the turn of 10th and 11th centuries and named after a nearby former gord. The Benedictine monastery was founded here in the mid-11th century. In 1234, Rajhrad was allowed to hold a market, and in 1330, it was called a market village. In 1339, it was first referred to as a market town.

In 2000, Rajhrad became a town.

Demographics

Transport
The D52 motorway runs next to the town.

Sights
The monastery is the main sight. It is one of the oldest and most valuable monasteries in Moravia. It includes the abbey Church of Saints Peter and Paul, which was built during the Baroque reconstruction of the monastery. It was designed by the architect Jan Santini Aichel. Today the monastery houses the Monument of Literature in Moravia with a historical library.

Notable people
Beda Dudík (1815–1890), historian; lived and died here
Josef Zelený (1824–1886), painter

References

External links

Cities and towns in the Czech Republic
Populated places in Brno-Country District